CMA Group (short for Consolidated Media Associates Limited) is a Nigerian global mass media company with interests in broadcasting, print and events management. It is West Africa's largest broadcasting and cable company in terms of airtime sales/syndication and on-air brand management. Consolidated Media Associates has Alphavision Multimedia as subsidiary and a General Media Production and Television powerhouse with footprints in Satellite, Cable, Digital and Terrestrial Television. CMA Group is the parent company for TV channels Soundcity TV, Trybe TV, Televista TV, Spice TV, ONTV Nigeria, ONMAX,  VillageSquare TV, Urban96 Radio Network, Access 24 and Televise TV and radio stations Soundcity Radio Network, Access 24 and Urban96 Radio Network. CMA's networks reach approximately 100 million viewers in 70 countries.

Over the last 15 years, CMA has provided television programming on a syndicated basis to television stations across Nigeria and the African continent.  More recently, it has produced themed television content to pay television platforms in Nigeria and expanded its distribution network to include satellite stations beyond Nigeria.  CMA is the most visible independent Nigerian medium of entertainment programming.

The corporate and operational office of the company is at Lekki Peninsula, Lagos.

Assets

 Television networks

 Soundcity TV
 Spice TV
 Televista TV
 Trybe TV
 ONMAX
 ONTV Nigeria
 Access 24 News Network
 Ummah Muslim Lifestyle Channel
 Life Christian Channel
 Xchange TV
 Correct TV
 Urban TV

 Radio networks

 Urban96 Radio Network
 Soundcity Radio Network
 Correct FM Network
 Access24 Radio Network

 Digital

 Xchange
 Papi Social
 Buddie
 Soundcity Mobile Applications
 Urban96 Mobile Applications

 Experientials

 Soundcity MVP
 Spice Lifestyle Honors
 Made in Lagos Festival
 Urban Culture Festival
 Afrobeats Festival
 Soundcity All Stars Party
 Design Fashion Africa Week
 The Intersection
 Game On
 Festival of Flavors
 Spice Xhibit F
 Spice Haute Party

References

External links
 
 Leadership.ng – CMA Group

Mass media companies of Nigeria
Companies based in Lagos